The 2021 Southeastern Conference softball tournament was a postseason softball tournament that determined the 2021 champion of the Southeastern Conference was the University of Alabama. It was held at Rhoads Stadium on the campus of the University of Alabama in Tuscaloosa, Alabama from May 11–15, 2021. The tournament's winner earned the SEC's automatic bid to the 2021 NCAA Division I softball tournament. The championship game, as well as the semifinals, was broadcast on ESPN2, while all other tournament games were televised on the SEC Network.

Bracket

References

SEC softball tournament
Southeastern Conference softball seasons
tournament
Southeastern Conference softball tournament
Southeastern Conference softball tournament